Infest is the second studio album and major-label debut by the American rock band Papa Roach. It was released on April 25, 2000, through DreamWorks Records, and became the 20th highest-selling album of 2000 in the United States. The sound of the album is nu metal and rap metal. Many of the album songs contains rapping and hip hop influences. It was certified 3× Platinum in the U.S. on July 18, 2001, and peaked at  5 on the Billboard 200 chart. This album earned the band a Grammy nomination for Best New Artist. It is their best-selling album to date. To commemorate the album's 20th anniversary, Papa Roach got together and performed the album live in its entirety in studio to stream worldwide on June 20, 2020. The whole performance was released on YouTube on September 15, 2020.

Background
Papa Roach was formed in 1993, as a funk metal and rap rock band. In February 1997, Papa Roach released their first album, Old Friends from Young Years, though the album failed to get the band a record deal. Papa Roach release new demos in 1998, and a demo in 1999 featuring the songs, "Last Resort", "Broken Home", "She Loves Me Not" (the only song which would not end up in this album, instead being re-recorded for Lovehatetragedy), "Infest", and "Dead Cell". Papa Roach toured in 1999; the band had an underground fan base in California. Due to the underground success of the 1999 demo heard by in house producers Tim & Bob, Papa Roach were signed to DreamWorks Records.

Writing and recording
Papa Roach went to the studio in late of 1999 to record Infest. Though many songs including "Last Resort", "Broken Home", "Revenge", and "Dead Cell" had already been recorded, the band re-recorded them and made some changes to the lyrics."Broken Home" deals with Jacoby Shaddix's broken relationship with his father. Papa Roach got Adam Goldstein to DJ for some tracks, including "Snakes". The closing track "Thrown Away" contains a softer, reggae-inspired version of the song "Tightrope", which starts at about 4:57. Papa Roach completed recording the album by early 2000.

Release and legacy
Infest was released in the United States and Canada on April 25, 2000, following radio play of "Last Resort". Infest debuted at No. 30 at the Billboard 200 albums chart. "Last Resort" became a massive hit throughout 2000 and peaked at No. 1 on the Billboard Modern Rock Tracks chart. With the massive mainstream success of "Last Resort", Infest reached No. 5 at the Billboard 200 albums chart and was certified Platinum by the RIAA. The follow-up singles from Infest, "Broken Home", and "Between Angels and Insects", also charted. Following the success, Papa Roach went on several of tours. In 2000, the band performed at tours including Vans Warped Tour and the Anger Management Tour with Nu Metal act Limp Bizkit and rap and hip hop acts such as Eminem, E-40, Xzibit, and Ludacris. In 2001, the band toured Ozzfest, where they performed main stage, on both the United States and United Kingdom tours. Papa Roach also played in some MTV shows during 2001. Infest was certified 3× Platinum by the RIAA and is Papa Roach's best-selling album to date.

In 2020, the album was put on the list of Kerrang! magazine's "The 21 greatest nu metal albums of all time"

Track listing

Import bonus tracks

Notes
 "Revenge" contains an interpolation of Roger Webb's "Assignation".
 "Blood Brothers" was replaced with "Legacy" [Clean version] on the censored version.
 "Tightrope" is a Hidden track.

Personnel
Papa Roach
 Jacoby Shaddix – lead vocals
 Jerry Horton – guitars, backing vocals
 Tobin Esperance – bass guitar, backing vocals
 Dave Buckner – drums, percussion

Additional musicians
 DJ AM – scratches on "Revenge" and "Snakes"
 Aimee Echo and Rodney Duke – background vocals on "Dead Cell"

Production
 Produced and mixed by Jay Baumgardner
 Engineer: David Dominguez
 Pro Tools and engineer: James Murray
 Mix engineer: D Rock
 Recorded and mixed at NRG Recording Services, North Hollywood
 Mastered by Howie Weinberg at Masterdisk, New York
 Art direction, photography and design: P.R. Brown at Bau-Da Design Lab LA

Appearances

 "Blood Brothers" appeared in the 2000 video game Tony Hawk's Pro Skater 2, the 2001 film The One (along with "Last Resort"), and the teaser trailer for the movie Evolution, soundtrack of the 2006 video game Flatout 2. The lyrics reference the Terminator's line "It's in your nature to destroy yourselves".
 "Never Enough" appeared in the 2001 racing video game Gran Turismo 3: A-Spec.
 "Last Resort" appeared in the second episode of Smallville and in an episode of Cold Case as well as other TV shows and movies (including The One), and American Dad! episode "The Hand That Rocks the Rogue". The 1999 demo version of is also available as a downloadable track in the Rock Band games.
 "Dead Cell" appeared in the films The Skulls and Queen of the Damned, and on the soundtrack for the 2001 video game Shaun Palmer's Pro Snowboarder.
 Guitar and bass guitar tab songbooks have been released for the album, both including the bonus track "Legacy".
 A heavier version of the song "Tightrope" was originally featured on the independent 1999 demo, Let 'Em Know.
 "Between Angels and Insects" is used by the WWF as the theme song for the WWF Invasion PPV.

Charts

Weekly charts

Year-end charts

Decade-end charts

Certifications

References

Papa Roach albums
2000 albums
Albums produced by Jay Baumgardner
DreamWorks Records albums